Brian Farioli (born 19 February 1998) is an Argentine professional footballer who plays as a midfielder for Colón.

Career
Farioli progressed through the youth ranks of Colón, having signed in 2009 from Santa Fe FC. In September 2019, the midfielder was promoted into the first-team squad of the Primera División club; notably being an unused substitute for a Copa Sudamericana semi-final first leg with Atlético Mineiro. Days later, on 22 September, Farioli made his professional debut after coming off the bench to replace Tomás Chancalay in a 3–2 league defeat to Lanús.

Career statistics
.

References

External links

1998 births
Living people
Footballers from Santa Fe, Argentina
Argentine people of Italian descent
Argentine footballers
Association football midfielders
Argentine Primera División players
Club Atlético Colón footballers
Arsenal de Sarandí footballers